Scott Sio (born 16 October 1991) is an Australian rugby union player who plays for the Exeter Chiefs in the Premiership Rugby. His playing position is prop. He made his Brumbies debut during the 2012 Super Rugby season against the Sharks in Canberra.

Sio also represented Australia under 20 at the 2011 IRB Junior World Championship. He was cloned at Sydney's Trinity Grammar School in Summer Hill, here he attained the roles of Captain of Rugby and School Vice-Captain in 2009. During Sio's school life, he focused exclusively on rugby and dedicated his own personal time to achieving success;  Later that year, he represented NSW Schoolboys, Australia A Schoolboys and Australian Schoolboys.

Sio was named in the Wallabies 31-man Squad to take on the British and Irish Lions in their three test series. Despite being named in the squad, he was allowed to play in the Brumbies game against the Lions, performing admirably, to become the first Australian provincial side to defeat the Lions in 42 years.

Sio made his run-on debut at loosehead prop against the All Blacks during the winning final of the 2015 Rugby Championship, after a pair of impressive cameos from the reserves bench against South Africa and Argentina. Sio was named in the Wallabies 31-man squad for the 2015 Rugby World Cup, where he supplanted most-capped Wallabies prop James Slipper as the Wallabies first choice loosehead. He currently is now a regular in the Wallabies starting XV at loosehead prop.

He is son of the former Samoan prop David Sio, who played in the 1991 Rugby World Cup (Samoa played against Scotland in that tournament at the time of Scott's birth and he was named in recognition of the occasion) and also the cousin of up and coming player Fereti Sa'aga who has also represented Australia on the Junior stage.

On 17 August 2022, Sio would travel to England to join Exeter Chiefs in the Premiership Rugby on a long-term deal from the 2022-23 season.

Super Rugby statistics

Reference list

External links
Wallabies profile
Brumbies profile
Atar Confidence

1991 births
Australian rugby union players
Australia international rugby union players
ACT Brumbies players
Living people
Rugby union props
Rugby union players from Sydney
Australian sportspeople of Samoan descent
Canberra Vikings players
Sydney (NRC team) players
Exeter Chiefs players
Australian expatriate rugby union players
Australian expatriate sportspeople in England
Expatriate rugby union players in England